JPATS may refer to:

 Joint Primary Aircraft Training System
 Justice Prisoner and Alien Transportation System